Diangi Matusiwa (born 21 December 1985) is an Angolan-Dutch footballer who plays for Belgian club FC Wezel Sport. He also represented Angola at the 2008 African Cup of Nations.

Career
Matusiwa played for Dutch club DHSC which he joined in January 2018 and played for until the summer. Ahead of the 2019–20 season, he then joined FC Wezel Sport.

References

External links

1985 births
Living people
Dutch people of Angolan descent
Angolan footballers
Angola international footballers
Angolan expatriate footballers
Association football forwards
Eerste Divisie players
Challenger Pro League players
Cypriot First Division players
Slovenian PrvaLiga players
Almere City FC players
FC Den Bosch players
K.V.K. Tienen-Hageland players
ND Mura 05 players
SC Telstar players
SV Argon players
APOP Kinyras FC players
Expatriate footballers in Belgium
Expatriate footballers in Cyprus
Expatriate footballers in Slovenia
DHSC players